Disneyland Paris is an entertainment resort in Chessy, France,  east of Paris. It encompasses two theme parks, resort hotels, Disney Nature Resorts, a shopping, dining and entertainment complex, and a golf course. Disneyland Park is the original theme park of the complex, opening in 1992. A second theme park, Walt Disney Studios Park, opened in 2002. Disneyland Paris celebrated its 30th anniversary in 2022; by then 320 million people had visited, making it the most visited theme park in Europe. It is the second Disney park outside the United States, following the opening of the Tokyo Disney Resort in 1983, and the largest. Disneyland Paris is also the only Disney resort outside of the United States to be completely owned by The Walt Disney Company. It includes 7 hotels: Santa Fe, Hotel Cheyenne, Sequoia Lodge, Newport Bay Club, Hotel New York - the Art of Marvel, The Disneyland Hotel, and Davy Crockett Ranch.

Ownership
Walt Disney announced a €1 billion ($1.25 billion) bailout plan to rescue its subsidiary Disneyland Paris, the Financial Times reported on 6 October 2014. The park is burdened by its debt, which is calculated at about €1.75 billion ($2.20 billion) and roughly 15 times its gross average earnings.

Until June 2017, Disney only held a minority stake in the resort. In 2017, The Walt Disney Company offered an informal takeover of Euro Disney S.C.A., buying 9% of the company from Kingdom Holding and an open offer of 2 euros per share for the remaining stock. This brought The Walt Disney Company's total ownership to 85.7%. The Walt Disney company will also invest an additional 1.5 billion euros to strengthen the company. On 19 June 2017 Disney completed a tender offer to own over 97% of Euro Disney and then implemented a full buyout of the shares they did not already own.

History

Seeking a location for a European resort

Following the success of Disneyland in California, plans to build a similar theme park in Europe emerged in 1966 with sites in Frankfurt, Paris, London or Milan under consideration. Under the leadership of E. Cardon Walker, Tokyo Disneyland opened in 1983 in Japan with instant success, forming a catalyst for international expansion. In late 1984 the heads of Disney's theme park division, Dick Nunis and Jim Cora, presented a list of approximately 1,200 possible European locations for the park. Britain, France, Italy and Spain were all considered. However, Britain and Italy were dropped from the list due to both lacking a suitable expanse of flat land. By March 1985, the number of possible locations for the park had been reduced to four; two in France and two in Spain. Both nations saw the potential economic advantages of a Disney theme park and offered competing financing deals to Disney.

Both Spanish sites were located near the Mediterranean and offered a subtropical climate similar to Disney's parks in California and Florida. Disney had asked each site to provide average temperatures for every month for the previous 40 years, which proved a complicated endeavour as none of the records were computerised. The site in Pego, Alicante became the front-runner, but the location was controversial as it would have meant the destruction of Marjal de Pego-Oliva marshlands, a site of natural beauty and one of the last homes of the almost extinct Samaruc or Valencia Toothcarp, so there was some local outcry among environmentalists. Disney had also shown interest in a site near Toulon in southern France, not far from Marseille. The pleasing landscape of that region, as well as its climate, made the location a top competitor for what would be called Euro Disneyland. However, shallow bedrock was encountered beneath the site, which would have rendered construction too difficult. Finally, a site in the rural town of Marne-la-Vallée was chosen because of its proximity to Paris and its central location in Western Europe. This location was estimated to be no more than a four-hour drive for 68 million people and no more than a two-hour flight for a further 300 million.

Michael Eisner signed the first letter of agreement with the French government for the  site on 18 December 1985, and the first financial contracts were drawn up during the following spring. The final contract was signed by the leaders of the Walt Disney Company and the French government and territorial collectivities on 24 March 1987. Construction began in August 1988, and in December 1990, an information centre named "Espace Euro Disney" was opened to show the public what was being constructed. Plans for a theme park next to Euro Disneyland based on the entertainment industry, Disney-MGM Studios Europe, quickly went into development, scheduled to open in 1996 with a construction budget of US$2.3 billion. The construction manager was Bovis.

Design and construction

In order to provide lodging to patrons, it was decided that 5,200 Disney-owned hotel rooms would be built within the complex. In March 1988, Disney and a council of architects (Frank Gehry, Michael Graves, Robert A.M. Stern, Stanley Tigerman, and Robert Venturi) decided on an exclusively American theme in which each hotel would depict a region of the United States. At the time of the opening in April 1992, seven hotels collectively housing 5,800 rooms had been built.

An entertainment, shopping, and dining complex based on Walt Disney World's Downtown Disney was designed by Frank Gehry.

With its towers of oxidised silver and bronze-coloured stainless steel under a canopy of lights, it opened as Festival Disney. For a projected daily attendance of 55,000, Euro Disney planned to serve an estimated 14,000 people per hour inside the Euro Disneyland park. In order to accomplish this, 29 restaurants were built inside the park (with a further 11 restaurants built at the Euro Disney resort hotels and five at Festival Disney). Menus and prices were varied with an American flavor predominant and Disney's precedent of not serving alcoholic beverages was continued in the park.

2,300 patio seats (30% of park seating) were installed to satisfy Europeans' expected preference of eating outdoors in good weather. In test kitchens at Walt Disney World, recipes were adapted for European tastes. Walter Meyer, executive chef for menu development at Euro Disney and executive chef of food projects development at Walt Disney World noted, "A few things we did need to change, but most of the time people kept telling us, 'Do your own thing. Do what's American'."

Recruitment/employment
Unlike Disney's American theme parks, Euro Disney aimed for permanent employees (an estimated requirement of 12,000 for the theme park itself), as opposed to seasonal and temporary part-time employees. Casting centres were set up in Paris, London, and Amsterdam. However, it was understood by the French government and Disney that "a concentrated effort would be made to tap into the local French labour market". Disney sought workers with sufficient communication skills, who spoke two European languages (French and one other), and were socially outgoing. Following precedent, Euro Disney set up its own Disney University to train workers. 24,000 people had applied by November 1991.

Controversies
The prospect of a Disney park in France was a subject of debate and controversy. Critics, who included prominent French intellectuals, denounced what they considered to be the cultural imperialism of Euro Disney and felt it would encourage an unhealthy American type of consumerism in France. On 28 June 1992, a group of French farmers blockaded Euro Disney in protest of farm policies supported at the time by the United States.

A journalist at the centre-right French newspaper Le Figaro wrote, "I wish with all my heart that the rebels would set fire to [Euro] Disneyland." Ariane Mnouchkine, a Parisian stage director, named the concept a "cultural Chernobyl", a phrase which would be echoed in the media during Euro Disney's initial years.

In response, French philosopher Michel Serres noted, "It is not America that is invading us. It is we who adore it, who adopt its fashions and above all, its words." Euro Disney S.C.A.'s then-chairman Robert Fitzpatrick responded, "We didn't come in and say O.K., we're going to put a beret and a baguette on Mickey Mouse. We are who we are."

Topics of controversy also included Disney's American managers requiring English to be spoken at all meetings and Disney's appearance code for members of staff, which listed regulations and limitations for the use of makeup, facial hair, tattoos, jewellery, and more.

French labour unions mounted protests against the appearance code, which they saw as "an attack on individual liberty". Others criticised Disney as being insensitive to French culture, individualism, and privacy, because restrictions on individual or collective liberties were illegal under French law, unless it could be demonstrated that the restrictions are requisite to the job and do not exceed what is necessary.

Disney countered by saying that a ruling that barred them from imposing such an employment standard could threaten the image and long-term success of the park. "For us, the appearance code has a great effect from a product identification standpoint," said Thor Degelmann, Euro Disney's personnel director. "Without it we couldn't be presenting the Disney product that people would be expecting."

Opening day and early years
Euro Disney opened for employee preview and testing in March 1992. During this time visitors were mostly park employees and their family members, who tested facilities and operations. The press was able to visit the day before the park's opening day on 12 April 1992.

On 12 April 1992, Euro Disney Resort and its theme park, Euro Disneyland, officially opened.  Visitors were warned of chaos on the roads. A government survey indicated that half a million people carried by 90,000 cars might attempt to enter the complex. French radio warned traffic to avoid the area. By midday, the car park was approximately half full, suggesting an attendance level below 25,000. Explanations of the lower-than-expected turnout included speculation that people heeded the advice to stay away and that the one-day strike that cut the direct RER railway connection to Euro Disney from the centre of Paris made the park inaccessible. Due to the European recession that August, the park faced financial difficulties as there were a lack of things to do and an overabundance of hotels, leading to underperformance. The failure of Euro Disney caused the cancellation of several projects like WestCOT, Disney's America, Tomorrowland 2055 at Disneyland and Beastly Kingdom at Disney's Animal Kingdom.

A new Indiana Jones roller-coaster ride was opened at Euro Disney in 1993. A few weeks after the ride opened there were problems with the emergency brakes which resulted in guest injuries.

In 1994, the company was still having financial difficulties. There were rumours that Euro Disney was getting close to having to file for bankruptcy. The banks and the backers had meetings to work out some of the financial problems facing Euro Disney. In March 1994 Team Disney went into negotiations with the banks so that they could get some help for their debt. As a last resort, the Walt Disney Company threatened to close the Disneyland Paris park, leaving the banks with the land.

Financial, attendance and employment struggles

In May 1992, entertainment magazine The Hollywood Reporter reported that about 25% of Euro Disney's workforce, approximately 3,000 people, had resigned from their jobs because of unacceptable working conditions. It also reported that the park's attendance was far behind expectations. The disappointing attendance can be at least partly explained by the recession and increased unemployment, which was affecting France and most of the rest of the developed world at this time; when construction of the resort began, the economy was still on an upswing.

Euro Disney S.C.A. responded in an interview with The Wall Street Journal, in which Robert Fitzpatrick claimed only 1,000 people had left their jobs. In response to the financial situation, Fitzpatrick ordered that the Disney-MGM Studios Europe project would be put on halt until a further decision could be made. Prices at the hotels were reduced.
 
Despite these efforts in May 1992, park attendance was around 25,000 (some reports give a figure of 30,000) instead of the predicted 60,000. The Euro Disney Company stock price spiraled downwards and on 23 July 1992, Euro Disney announced an expected net loss in its first year of operation of approximately 300 million French francs. During Euro Disney's first winter, hotel occupancy was so low that it was decided to close the Newport Bay Club hotel during the season.

Initial hopes were that each visitor would spend around US$33 per day, but near the end of 1992, analysts found spending to be around 12% lower. Efforts to improve attendance included serving alcoholic beverages with meals inside the Euro Disneyland park, in response to a presumed European demand, which began 12 June 1993.

By the summer of 1994, Euro Disney was burdened with $3 billion worth of debt. Disney CFO Richard Nanula and Wall Street financier Steve Norris worked with Alwaleed's business advisor Mustafa Al Hejailan to rescue the overleveraged company.  In that deal, the Walt Disney Corporation's 49 percent stake was reduced to 39 percent, the banks agreed to forego interest payments until 1997, Disney wrote off royalties and fees until 1999, and Alwaleed agreed to pay $345 million for a 24 percent stake in Euro Disney.

1995 turnaround
On 1 October 1994, Euro Disney changed its name to Disneyland Paris. On 31 May 1995, a new attraction opened at the theme park. Space Mountain: De la Terre à la Lune had been planned since the inception of Disneyland Paris under the name Discovery Mountain, but was reserved for a revival of public interest. With a redesign of the attraction (which had premiered as Space Mountain at the Walt Disney World Resort's Magic Kingdom in 1975) including a "cannon launch" system, inversions, and an on-ride soundtrack, the US$100 million attraction was dedicated in a ceremony attended by celebrities such as Elton John, Claudia Schiffer, and Buzz Aldrin.

On 25 July 1995, Disneyland Paris reported its first quarterly profit of US$35.3 million. On 15 November 1995, the results for the fiscal year ending 30 September 1995 were released; in one year the theme park's attendance had climbed from 8.8 million to 10.7 million, an increase of 21%. Hotel occupancy had also climbed from 60 to 68.5%. After debt payments, Disneyland Paris ended the year with a net profit of US$22.8 million.

2000 onwards
As of March 2002, Disneyland Paris underwent a second name change to Disneyland Resort Paris. In 2002, Euro Disney S.C.A. and the Walt Disney Company announced another annual profit for Disneyland Paris. However, it then incurred a net loss in the three years following. By March 2004, the Walt Disney Company had agreed to write off all debt that Euro Disney S.C.A. owed to the Walt Disney Company. On 1 December 2003, Euro Disney S.C.A launched the 'Need Magic?' campaign, which lasted until March 2006 to bring new, first-time European visitors to the resort. And by 2005, having been open fewer than fifteen years, Disneyland Paris had become the number one tourist destination for Europe, outselling the Louvre and the Eiffel Tower.

In March 2006, Disneyland Resort Paris launched the advertising campaign "believe in your dreams" and paired with the TGV East European Line to encourage European family attendance to the resort. Shortly after announcing a 12% increase in revenues for the fiscal year of 2007, Euro Disney S.C.A. implemented a "reverse split" consolidation of shares of 100 to 1. August 2008 brought the resort's 200 millionth visitor, and made for the third consecutive year of growth in revenues for the resort as well as a record 15.3 million visitors in attendance.

In 2009, the resort demonstrated dedication to the recruitment of new employment positions, especially for the Christmas and summer seasons, which continued in 2010 and 2011 when 2,000 and 3,000 employment contracts being offered, respectively. The 2009 fiscal year saw a decrease in revenues by 7% and a net loss of 63 million followed by stable revenues at 1.2 billion in fiscal 2010. Euro Disney S.C.A. refinanced their debt to Walt Disney Company again for 1.3 billion euros in September 2012.

A study done by the Inter-ministerial Delegation reviewing Disneyland Paris' contribution to the French economy was released in time for the Resort's 20th anniversary in March 2012. It found that despite the resort's financial hardships, it has generated "37 billion euros in tourism-related revenues over twenty years", supports on average 55,000 jobs in France annually, and that one job at Disneyland Paris generates nearly three jobs elsewhere in France.

For the first time in the resort's history, both the Disneyland Park and Walt Disney Studios Park closed from 14 to 17 November 2015, as part of France's national days of mourning following the November 2015 Paris attacks.

On 19 June 2017, the resort's operating company, Euro Disney S.C.A, was acquired by The Walt Disney Company, giving them full control of the resort. In December 2018, Natacha Rafalski took over as CEO. On 1 September 2017 the resort's second nature resort opened as Les Villages Nature Paris.

On 27 February 2018, Walt Disney Company CEO Bob Iger announced that company would invest €2 billion into the Disneyland Paris resort. The Walt Disney Studios Park will be expanded with three new areas based upon Marvel, Frozen and Star Wars. In addition to the three new areas, the expansion includes a new lake, which will be the focal point for entertainment experiences and will also connect each of the new park areas. The first phase of the expansion will be completed in 2021. In April 2019, the location hosted a Dota 2 esports tournament.

In March 2018, a Disney Parks West regional division was formed with Disneyland Resort in California, Walt Disney World in Florida, and Disneyland Paris under Catherine Powell, outgoing Disneyland Paris president. This mirrors the Disney Parks East regional division consisting of Shanghai Disney Resort, Hong Kong Disneyland and Walt Disney Attractions Japan and headed by Michael Colglazier. Natacha Rafalski was promoted from chief financial officer to president for Disneyland Paris in December 2018. In September 2019, Powell exited her post as president of the Parks West division, with the division dissolving, and Disneyland Paris transferred to Disney Parks International, while the East region reverted to its prior name.

On 1 June 2019, Disneyland Paris sponsored the Magical Pride Party, an LGBTQ celebration. Previous similar events have taken place at the park since 2014, but were not officially sponsored by Disney.

On 15 March 2020, in line with other Disney parks and resorts, Disneyland Paris was shut down due to the worldwide COVID-19 pandemic. Disneyland Park and Walt Disney Studios Park reopened to the public on 15 July with the rest of the resort. On 29 October 2020, the resort closed again due to a second nationwide lockdown. Disneyland Paris re-opened on 17 June 2021.

Name changes
Disneyland Paris and its properties have been subject to a number of name changes, initially an effort to overcome the negative publicity that followed the inception of the Euro Disney Resort.

 12 April 199231 May 1994: Euro Disney Resort
 1 June30 September 1994: Euro Disneyland Paris
 1 October 199415 March 2002: Disneyland Paris
 16 March 20023 April 2009: Disneyland Resort Paris
 4 April 2009present: Disneyland Paris (again)

Theme Years
 1st Anniversary (12 April 19931994) 
 5th Anniversary (12 April 19971998) 
 10th Anniversary (12 April 20022003) 
 12th Anniversary (12 April 20042005) 
 15th Anniversary (following premieres: 31 March 2007, The events officially began: 1 April 2007, 12 April 2007March 2009)
 Mickey's Magical Party (4 April 2009March 2010)
 New Generation Festival (a.k.a. 18th Anniversary) (1 April 2010, 12 April 20102011) 
 20th Anniversary (12 April 20122013, extended until 2014) 
 25th Anniversary (12 April 20172018) 
 30th Anniversary (6 March 2022, 12 April 20222023)

Anniversary list

 1st Anniversary (1993–1994)
 5th Anniversary (1997–1998)
 10th Anniversary (2002–2003)
 12th Anniversary (2004–2005)
 15th Anniversary (2007–2008) 
 18th Anniversary (1 April 20102011) 
 20th Anniversary (2012–2013)
 25th Anniversary (2017–2018)
 30th Anniversary (2022–2023)

The complex

Disneyland Paris contains 2 theme parks, 8 resort hotels, 7 associated hotels, a golf course, a high-speed rail station, a large outlet centre (la vallée village), and a large shopping mall: Val d'Europe.

Parks
Disneyland Park opened with the resort on 12 April 1992 and is based on a larger scale of the original Disneyland in California and the Magic Kingdom in Florida.
Walt Disney Studios Park opened on 16 March 2002 celebrating show business, films, and behind-the-scenes.

Shopping, dining, and entertainment
Disney Village, an entertainment district containing a variety of restaurants, entertainment venues and shops.
Val d'Europe, a shopping centre with a variety of outlet shops and large department stores.

Other recreation
Golf Disneyland features 9-hole and 18-hole courses.

Attractions

According to the Disneyland Paris website the theme park's top five attractions in Disneyland Park are It's a Small World, Star Wars Hyperspace Mountain (formerly known as Space Mountain: Mission 2), Big Thunder Mountain, Pirates of the Caribbean, and Buzz Lightyear's Lazer Blast. It's a Small World, located in Fantasyland, takes visitors on a musical tour of world attractions; Star Tours and Hyperspace Mountain (which is a roller coaster) are situated in the Discoveryland district; Big Thunder Mountain is a mine train roller coaster within Frontierland; Pirates of the Caribbean is located in Adventureland; and Buzz Lightyear's Lazer Blast, also located in Discoveryland, was inspired by the Disney/Pixar film Toy Story 2 and features people attempting to successfully shoot lasers at seemingly moving targets to earn as many points as possible.

The park receives around twelve million visitors a year, which makes it the most visited place in Europe.

In 2018, The Walt Disney Company announced a multi-year expansion project. It is expected to be completed by 2024 in time for the 2024 Summer Olympics in Paris.

Roller coasters

Rides

Hotels
The complex features six Disneyland Paris hotels. The Disneyland Hotel is located over the entrance of the Disneyland Park and is marketed as the most prestigious hotel on the property. A body of water known as Lake Disney is surrounded by Disney Hotel New York — The Art of Marvel, Disney Newport Bay Club, and Disney Sequoia Lodge. Disney Hotel Cheyenne and Disney Hotel Santa Fe are located near Lake Disney; Disney Davy Crockett Ranch is located in a woodland area outside the resort perimeter.

Disneyland Paris includes six on-site partner hotels that are not managed by The Walt Disney Company but provide free shuttle buses to the parks: B&B Hotel, Algonquin's Explorers Hotel and Campanile Val de France. There are also two associated hotels located in Val d'Europe: Adagio Marne-la-Vallée Val d'Europe and Hôtel l'Élysée Val d'Europe.

Disney Hotel New York - The Art of Marvel opened on 21 June 2021.

Disney Nature Resorts

Transport

A large railway station, Marne-la-Vallée–Chessy, is located between the theme parks and Disney Village. It opened on 1 April 1992 and is notably served by regional express line RER A which provides a direct connection with the centre of Paris and for further connections, direct to Paris - Gare de Lyon.

The railway station is also served by long-distance high-speed TGV and Ouigo trains offering direct services to many cities across France.  There are also Eurostar services from and to London St Pancras International until 5 June 2023. There are also Thalys services to both Brussels and Amsterdam.

Free Disney shuttle buses provide transport to all Disney hotels and Les Villages Nature Paris (except Disney Davy Crockett Ranch) and Associated Hotels. They are accessed from the Disneyland bus station.

Backstage Disney
Disneyland Paris has strict rules designed to prevent guests from seeing backstage areas of the park. Photography and filming are strictly forbidden in all backstage areas. The edges of the parks are lined with ride buildings and foliage to hide areas that are not for the public to see. Numerous area gates allow entrance into the park for cast members, parade floats, etc. When area gates around the park are open, anything that can be seen through them is considered to be on-stage and part of the Disney Magic. Therefore, from the moment the gates are open, all of the cast must be in character and in place to 'perform'. As the complex is so big, shuttle buses take cast members to different parts of the parks via service roads located around the perimeter of the parks.

Many attractions are housed in large, soundstage-like buildings called "show buildings", some of which are partially or completely disguised by external theming. Most show buildings have off-white flat roofs that support HVAC units and footpaths for maintenance cast members. Housed inside show buildings are the actual attractions, which include hidden walkways, service areas, control rooms, and other backstage operations.

Attendance

Electroland Festival 
On 8 July 2017, Disneyland hosted its first-ever EDM festival entitled Electroland, in celebration of Disneyland Paris' 25th anniversary. Steve Aoki, NERVO & Michael Calfan were the main highlights of the first edition. The second edition of the festival was held on 29 and 30 June 2018, which featured Afrojack, Dimitri Vegas & Like Mike, Klingande, Robin Schulz, Bob Sinclair, Mosimann and Lovely Laura & Ben Santiago. The third edition was held over a span of 3 days from 5 July through to 7 July in 2019. The theme of the third edition was based upon Disney's movie The Lion King. The lineup included Steve Aoki, Nervo, Showtek, The Magician, Nicky Romero, Alesso, Armin Van Buuren, Nora En Pure etc. Disneyland also announced the fourth edition of the 3-day festival in 2020 starting from 4 July.

Notable incidents 
For a list of incidents that occurred at Disneyland Paris see: List of incidents at Disneyland Paris.

See also

Large amusement railways
Rail transport in Walt Disney Parks and Resorts
The Walt Disney Company

References

External links

Official website

 
Paris
1992 establishments in France
Amusement parks in France
Buildings and structures in Seine-et-Marne
Tourist attractions in Île-de-France
Tourist attractions in Seine-et-Marne
Amusement parks opened in 1992